German-Russian classical pianist Olga Scheps has released ten studio albums and one live album. Her first live album was recorded and published in the Edition Klavier-Festival Ruhr in cooperation with the Fono Forum magazine under CAvi-music in 2009.

She signed her first exclusive contract with RCA Red Seal (Sony Music) in 2009. It was followed by the release of her debut studio album, Chopin, which peaked in the top-ten on the German classical charts containing the works of Frédéric Chopin. Olga Scheps won the ECHO Klassik Award 2010 for Newcomer of the Year (Piano) because of the very good sales figures she enjoyed with her debut during the year. The pianist's third and latest studio album, Schubert, was released in 2012. Olga Scheps has achieved considerable critical success for her works. Especially for her debut the German Frankfurter Allgemeine Zeitung calls her "the new star in the Chopin heaven" after a solo recital.

Albums

Studio albums

Live albums

Music videos

Notes

References

External links
 

Discographies of classical pianists
Discographies of German artists